Death Rite is a 1976 psychological thriller film co-written and directed by Claude Chabrol, and based on the novel Initiation au meurtre by Frédéric Dard.

Plot
At a luxury hotel in Djerba, Tunisia, psychic magician Vestar (Fröbe) meets the dark Edouard (Rochefort). Heading to the hotel, Vestar has a vision of a woman being murdered in the desert. Edouard, a member of the leisure class, decides to use his influence to make the dream become a reality. Also staying at the resort are Sadry, returning (Nero) who has come home to visit his dying mother, and his annoying wife Sylvia (Sandrelli). Also there is Martine (von Weitershausen), an ex-lover of Sadry who would like to get back together with him. The marriage is further strained when Sylvia finds the two of them together. It appears that the prophesied murder has something to do with Sylvia. Specific details from Vestar's prediction about her death are used by Edouard to make it happen, although in fact his interference alters the results. Sadry comes to terms with her tensions and anger as events build toward the inevitable.

Principal cast

Reception
The film was a commercial failure, with only 51,682 tickets sold in France.

References

External links 

1970s psychological drama films
1970s psychological thriller films
1976 films
Adultery in films
Films about magic and magicians
Films directed by Claude Chabrol
Films set in Tunisia
Films shot in France
Films shot in Tunisia
French drama films
French psychological thriller films
Italian drama films
West German films
Films with screenplays by Paul Gégauff
Films based on French novels
1976 drama films
1970s French-language films
1970s French films
1970s Italian films